You're in the Navy Now is a 1951 American war drama film about the United States Navy in the first months of World War II. The film was directed by Henry Hathaway and stars Gary Cooper as a new officer wanting duty at sea but who is instead assigned to an experimental project without much hope of success. It was released by 20th Century Fox and its initial release was titled U.S.S. Teakettle. When the film failed to gain an audience, it was re-titled to the present title.

Filmed in black-and-white aboard the active Navy patrol craft PC-1168, You're in the Navy Now featured the film debuts of Charles Bronson, Lee Marvin and Harvey Lembeck in minor roles as crewmen. Screenwriter Richard Murphy was nominated by the Writers Guild of America for "Best Written American Comedy", basing his script on an article written by John W. Hazard in The New Yorker. Hazard, a professional journalist and naval reservist, had served during World War II as executive officer of the PC-452, a similar craft that served in 1943–44 as a test bed for steam turbine propulsion.

Plot
At Norfolk Naval Base in the opening months of World War II, Lieutenant John W. Harkness (Cooper), a newly commissioned officer, bids goodbye to wife Ellie (Jane Greer) and reports aboard the PC-1168 unaware that his civilian background in engineering and his Rutgers education has elected him, by means of a hole punched in an IBM card, to head a secret project and command the ship. The Navy has installed a steam engine and an experimental evaporator-condenser in the ship to test its feasibility in patrol craft and has assigned Harkness to conduct the sea trials.

The crew of the submarine chaser assume that Harkness is Regular Navy. Her chief boatswain's mate, Chief Larrabee (Millard Mitchell), and her chief machinist's mate are the only experienced seamen aboard. PC-1168'''s crew are all newly inducted civilians, and her officers recently commissioned "90 day wonders". The exec, Lt. (j.g.) Barron (Eddie Albert), is a good-natured idea-man whose knowledge of seamanship is out of books. The engineering officer, Ens. Barbo (Jack Webb), has no training, education, or experience in engineering. And the supply-Mess officer, Ens. Dorrance (Richard Erdman), is plagued by seasickness.

After badly damaging the bow of the ship their first time underway, Harkness and his officers butt heads with gruff Commander Reynolds (John McIntire), who oversees the project as the representative of Rear Admiral Tennant (Ray Collins). The first trial results in the ship being towed into port, disparaged as the "USS Teakettle" by the rest of the base. Reynolds restricts the crew to the ship until they make the system work, and as the failures mount, the crew's morale plummets, threatening the entire project. Ellie, who is with the WAVES, gets information to her husband about Tennant's activities.

The officers hit upon a scheme to enter a crewman in the base boxing championship to unite the crew. They train an engine room sailor, Wascylewski (Charles Bronson), to represent the ship. The crew bets heavily on their shipmate, and to ensure that the "Teakettle" does not fail a sea trial scheduled for the day of the fight, smuggles distilled water aboard. Wascylewski breaks his ribs during the sea trial, forcing Barbo to stand in, but surprisingly he wins the championship.

The film climaxes with the Official Sea Trial of the "Teakettle" in which the crew improvises a successful run. Even so, the trial ends in humiliation for the crew when the ship rams an aircraft carrier—again. At the board of inquiry that follows, Admiral Tennant reveals to Harkness that the selection of his crew was no fluke: the Navy already knew that experts could run the system; it needed to see if novice sailors, who made up the overwhelming percentage of the wartime Navy, could quickly learn to operate it.

Cast
Gary Cooper – Lieutenant John Harkness
Jane Greer – Ensign Ellie Harkness
Millard Mitchell – Chief George Larrabee
Eddie Albert – Lieutenant (j.g.) Bill Barron
John McIntire – Commander W.R. Reynolds
Ray Collins – Rear Admiral L.E. Tennant
Jack Webb – Ensign Tony Barbo
Richard Erdman – Ensign Chuck Dorrance
Charles Bronson – Wascylewski [Waszylewski?]
Harry von Zell – Captain Danny Eliot
Ed Begley – Port commander
Harvey Lembeck – Seaman Norelli
Lee Marvin – signalman
Jack Warden – Helmsman Morris
Henry Slate  – Engineer Ryan

Production
Development
The screenplay was based on the article "The Flying Teakettle" by John W. Hazard, printed in the January 21, 1950 issue of The New Yorker. This humorous piece recounted incidents from Hazard's own World War II experience as captain of a diesel-powered warship. Though both Hazard and his crew had little experience at sea, they were selected to participate in a Navy experimental program that ultimately ended in failure.

Upon purchasing the rights, 20th Century Fox changed the title to U.S.S. Teakettle. Though neither director Henry Hathaway nor screenwriter Richard Murphy was adept at comedy, the studio relied on the "potential absurdities" of the storyline about inexperienced reservists "guiding an unreliable vessel through treacherous waters" to carry the film.

Casting
Studio contract player William Lundigan was initially considered for the lead role of Lieutenant John Harkness. When the budget was increased to include location filming at U.S. Navy yards in Virginia, the studio hired Gary Cooper to increase the audience appeal and bankability of the project. The film marked Cooper's first starring role for 20th Century Fox, which had hired him as an extra in the 1925 silent film The Lucky Horseshoe. Joanne Dru was the studio's first choice for the character of Ensign Ellie Harkness, but when she declined to sign a long-term contract, Jane Greer was cast instead.

The film marked the screen debuts of Lee Marvin, Charles Bronson, and Harvey Lembeck, and the second film appearance of Jack Warden.

FilmingYou're in the Navy Now was filmed in black-and-white in 1950 on location in Newport News, Virginia, at the Norfolk Naval Yard in Hampton Roads, Virginia, and aboard the PC-1168 based there. Except for stock footage of a boxing match, verisimilitude in the film was high. With the exception of the Albemarle, all (including PC-1168) were anachronistic to the date of the storyline.

ReleaseU.S.S. Teakettle premiered at the Roxy Theater in New York City on February 23, 1951. 20th Century Fox launched a nationwide promotional tour featuring Cooper, who also agreed to appear in the film's trailer.

Reception
Critical reviews
The film received positive reviews from critics. Variety called it "rib-tickling filmfare", noting that the series of adventures aboard ship "are run off smartly and help to disguise fact that there’s practically no plot". This review also cited Cooper's performance for "sharpening up the entertainment values". Bosley Crowther of The New York Times praised the screenplay, acting, and directing, calling it "the most explosively funny service picture that has come along since the nickelodeon versions of the sinking of the battleship Maine". Otis Guernsey Jr. wrote in his review for Herald-Tribune: "Gary Cooper is ideally cast. His acting is of the economical and yet clear and versatile type that would make any audience identify itself with his frustration".

Box office and re-titling
Despite glowing reviews, the film did not attract audiences. Rather than re-edit and re-release the film, 20th Century Fox gave it a new title, You're in the Navy Now, in March 1951 and continued its run. With the new title, the film fared slightly better at the box office. It eventually lodged a net loss of $122,000.

Modern reviews
Modern reviews are less complimentary. Craig Butler of AllMovie calls You're in the Navy Now "a disappointing naval comedy that seems to have played much better when it was originally released. ... Seen today, it's labored and frequently boring". Butler critiques Hathaway's direction as "workmanlike and uninspired", and Cooper's "attempts at comedy are too often forced". Erickson agrees: "Viewed today, You're in the Navy Now doesn't seem quite as funny as many observers thought it was in 1951, hampered by the cut-and-dried 'factory' look common to most 20th Century Fox releases of the era".

Lawsuit
Arthur Curtis, author of the 1944 novel Hey, Mac! You're in the Navy Now, sued 20th Century Fox for $100,000 in March 1953, claiming the film title infringed on his book's title. The case was decided in the studio's favor by a California superior court in July 1953; a California District Court of Appeals upheld the lower court's decision in April 1956.

 See also You're in the Army Now'', a 1941 comedy film

References

Sources

External links

 
 

1951 comedy films
1951 films
20th Century Fox films
American comedy films
American black-and-white films
Films directed by Henry Hathaway
Films scored by Cyril J. Mockridge
Films about the United States Navy in World War II
Military humor in film
1950s English-language films
1950s American films